Palesisa is a genus of flies in the family Tachinidae.

Species
P. aureola Richter, 1974
P. maculosa (Villeneuve, 1936)
P. nudioculata Villeneuve, 1929

References

Exoristinae
Diptera of Europe
Diptera of Asia
Tachinidae genera
Taxa named by Joseph Villeneuve de Janti